William, Willie, Bill, or Billy Horne may refer to:

Politics 
 William Horne (British politician) (1774–1860) British member of parliament and Attorney General for England and Wales
 Bill Horne (born 1948), Canadian politician
 William C. Horne (b. 1962), Nevada state representative
 William S. Horne (1936–2022), Maryland politician and judge

Sports 
 William Horne (golfer) (born 1880), English golfer
 William Horne (footballer) (1885–1930), English football player
 Billy Horne (1916–1969), American baseball player
 Willie Horne (1922–2001), English rugby league player

Others 
 Brother William Horne (d. 1540), one of the "Carthusian Martyrs"
 William Kenneth Horne (1883–1959), British colonial judge and speaker
 William Horne (tenor) (1913–1983), operatic tenor, notably with the New York City Opera

See also
 William Horn (1841–1922), Australian mining magnate, pastoralist, politician, author, sculptor and philanthropist
 Will Horn, American baseball player of the 1900s
 Bill Horn (born 1967), Canadian ice hockey player and coach
 Billy Horn (born 1938), Scottish footballer
 Sir William Whorne, Lord Mayor of London in 1487